The 1986 NCAA Men's Water Polo Championship was the 18th annual NCAA Men's Water Polo Championship to determine the national champion of NCAA men's collegiate water polo. Tournament matches were played at the Belmont Plaza Pool in Long Beach, California during December 1986.

Stanford defeated rival California in the final, 9–6, to win their sixth national title. Coached by Dante Dettamanti, the Cardinal finished the season undefeated, 36–0.

The Most Outstanding Players of the tournament were Fernando Carsalade (UCLA), David Imbernino (Stanford), and Craig Klass (Stanford). An All-Tournament Team of eight players was also named. 

The tournament's leading scorer was Robert Lynn from USC (12 goals).

Qualification
Since there has only ever been one single national championship for water polo, all NCAA men's water polo programs (whether from Division I, Division II, or Division III) were eligible. A total of 8 teams were invited to contest this championship.

Bracket
Site: Belmont Plaza Pool, Long Beach, California

All-tournament team 
Fernando Carsalade, UCLA (Co-Most outstanding player)
David Imbernino, Stanford (Co-Most outstanding player)
Craig Klass, Stanford (Co-Most outstanding player)
Jeff Brush, California
Kirk Everist, California
Erich Fischer, Stanford
Robert Lynn, USC
Bill Schoening, California

See also 
 NCAA Men's Water Polo Championship

References

NCAA Men's Water Polo Championship
NCAA Men's Water Polo Championship
1986 in sports in California
December 1986 sports events in the United States
1986